Tonnoiromyia is a genus of crane fly in the family Limoniidae.

Distribution
Argentina, Chile & Australia.

Species
T. montina Alexander, 1933
T. patagonica Alexander, 1929
T. spinulosa Alexander, 1971
T. tasmaniensis Alexander, 1926
T. undoolya Theischinger, 1994

References

Limoniidae
Diptera of South America
Diptera of Australasia